Jordan Alexandre Grilo Santos better known as Jordan (born 2 July 1991) is a Portuguese beach soccer player. He plays as a forward for S.C. Braga and for the Portugal national beach soccer team.

Career
Jordan won the 2019 Mundialito de Clubes with S.C. Braga.

References

External links

Portuguese beach soccer players
1991 births
Living people
European Games bronze medalists for Portugal
Beach soccer players at the 2015 European Games
European Games medalists in beach soccer
Beach soccer players at the 2019 European Games
European Games gold medalists for Portugal